Vanessa Bell Armstrong ( Bell; born October 2, 1953) is an American gospel singer who released her debut album Peace Be Still in 1983. Armstrong is an 7x Grammy Award Nominee, Stellar Award Winner, and a Soul Train Award winner. She has worked with many in the industry such as, Mattie Moss Clark, Darryl Coley, The Clark Sisters, Rance Allen, James Cleveland, and a host of others.  The Detroit Native also has an honorary doctorate degree in theology from Next Dimension University at the West Angeles Cathedral in Los Angeles on Saturday, August 20, 2017.

Career 

Armstrong made her solo debut on Onyx/Muscle Shoals Sound Records in 1983 with the album Peace Be Still. The title track has since become one of Armstrong's signature songs.
Armstrong's second album Chosen hit number one on the US Billboard Top Gospel Albums chart.

Armstrong performed on the 1st Annual Soul Train Awards ceremony. Her 1986 album Following Jesus won a Soul Train Music Award for Best Gospel Album – Solo in 1988. She is also a seven time Grammy Award-nominee.

Armstrong enjoyed a slice of mainstream success in the late 1980s.  Her self-titled 1987 Jive Records debut yielded the Billboard-charting hit "You Bring Out The Best in Me," as well as the club favorite "Pressing On." The next year's follow-up album Wonderful One featured a cover of the Labi Siffre anti-Apartheid anthem "Something Inside So Strong." The song was later remade in 1995 by Armstrong along with Shirley Caesar, Fred Hammond, Tramaine Hawkins, Yolanda Adams, and a host of other gospel artists as a tribute to Rosa Parks. The song was serviced to radio stations to play on the 40th anniversary of the civil rights icon's arrest.

Armstrong appeared on Broadway in 1991 in a production of Don't Get God Started. "Always," a Marvin Winans composition that anchors the play, also appears on Armstrong's 1987 self-titled album. Her Broadway role lead to a cameo appearance in the Oprah Winfrey TV special The Women of Brewster Place. Armstrong was also chosen to record the theme to the popular 1980s NBC sitcom Amen.

Armstrong took a three-year self-imposed hiatus from recording before releasing A Brand New Day under a new deal with Tommy Boy Gospel in 2001. She was presented with a lifetime achievement award during 2004's Gospel Superfest.

Armstrong's 2007 album, Walking Miracle, is her first release in 6 years, and blends traditional gospel fare like "So Good To Me" (produced by Smokie Norful) with contemporary songs like "Til The Victory's Won" (produced by Fred Jerkins III) and the title track (produced by Rodney Jerkins). The latter song was inspired by Armstrong's son who was recently diagnosed with multiple sclerosis.

Discography

Albums

Compilations

Singles

Other works and collaborations 
Armstrong recorded a stand out duet "Choose Ye" with gospel act The Winans on their major label debut Let My People Go for Qwest Records. She also sang the theme song for the 1980s NBC sitcom Amen.

Armstrong was a frequent musical guest of the early projects of John P. Kee & The New Life Community Choir, and lent her voice to several classics that include "We Walk By Faith", and "We Glorify".

Awards and honors 
Grammy Nominations
 Best Soul Gospel Performance – Female for Peace Be Still (1983)
 Best Soul Gospel Performance – Female for Chosen (1985)
 Best Soul Gospel Performance – Duo, Group, Choir or Chorus for "Choose Ye" (1986)
 Best Soul Gospel Performance – Female for "Pressing On" (1988)
Best Traditional Soul Gospel Album for The Truth About Christmas (1991)
Best Contemporary Soul Gospel Album for Something On the Inside (1993)
Best Traditional Soul Gospel Album for The Experience (2009)

Personal life 
Armstrong has five children.

References

External links 

Official MySpace Page
Official Vanessa Bell Armstrong site on EMI Gospel
Flashback Friday – Vanessa Bell Armstrong – Chosen

1953 births
Living people
20th-century African-American women singers
American gospel singers
Urban contemporary gospel musicians
Singers from Detroit
American Pentecostals
21st-century African-American women singers